Zeeland Hall, on South Main Street in Zeeland, North Dakota, was built in 1936 as a Works Progress Administration project.  It was listed on the National Register of Historic Places in 2016.

It is a one-story Colonial Revival-style building.

The Colonial Revival style is relatively unusual for New Deal public works projects;  Moderne is more common.

References

National Register of Historic Places in McIntosh County, North Dakota
Colonial Revival architecture in North Dakota
Government buildings completed in 1936
Works Progress Administration in North Dakota
City and town halls on the National Register of Historic Places in North Dakota
1936 establishments in North Dakota